Sam Boaz (1917 – February 8, 2013) was an American jurist.

After graduating from University of Tennessee College of Law, Boaz served in the United States Foreign Service and was stationed in the United Kingdom serving at the United States Embassy. He then returned to Tennessee and practiced law in Clarksville, Tennessee. He served in the Tennessee House of Representatives 1963-1967 as a Democrat. He then served on the Montgomery County, Tennessee criminal court and then served on the Tennessee Court of Criminal Appeals.

Notes

1917 births
2013 deaths
People from Clarksville, Tennessee
University of Tennessee College of Law alumni
American diplomats
Tennessee lawyers
Tennessee state court judges
Democratic Party members of the Tennessee House of Representatives
20th-century American judges
20th-century American lawyers